Lampa may refer to:

Places
 Lampa, Chile, a Chilean town in the Province of Chacabuco, Metropolitan Region of Santiago
 Lampa, China, an alternative name for Lampacau, an island in the Pearl River Delta
 Lampa (Crete), a town of ancient Crete, Greece
 Lampa, Peru
 Lampa Province, Peru
 Lampa, Poland

People
 Rachael Lampa, Christian pop and rock singer

Other
 Lampa (film) (Lamp), a Polish film
 LAMPA, an abbreviation for  lysergic acid methylpropylamide
 Lampa (see), a former bishopric and current titular see of the Roman Catholic Church

See also
Lampas, a luxury fabric